Dorothy Lake State Natural Area is a Wisconsin Department of Natural Resources-designated State Natural Area featuring forested end moraine topography, with many steep-sided ridges and depressions. This results in a diverse mosaic of natural communities, including forests, swamps, fens, lakes, and streams.

Location and access 

Description 
The namesake of the natural area, Dorothy Lake, is a 5.2 acre soft-water seepage lake, and contains a large, diverse assemblage of invertebrates, as well as three rare plant species. Three smaller, unnamed lakes surround Dorothy Lake, one of which contains a high-quality floating poor fen border. The uplands surrounding the lakes and wetlands contain northern mesic and dry-mesic forests, of primarily white pine (Pinus strobus), red pine (Pinus resinosa), and red oak (Quercus rubra). Rare plant species that can be found on the site include Blunt-Lobe Grape Fern (Botrychium oneidense), Prickly Hornwort (Ceratophyllum echinatum), White Adder's Mouth (Malaxis monophyllos), Farwell's Water Milfoil (Myriophyllum farwellii), Bog Bluegrass (Poa paludigena), and Hidden-Fruited Bladderwort (Utricularia geminiscapa).

References

External links 
Dorothy Lake State Natural Area
Google Map of Dorothy Lake State Natural Area

Protected areas established in 2010
Protected areas of Chippewa County, Wisconsin
State Natural Areas of Wisconsin
Lakes of Chippewa County, Wisconsin
2010 establishments in Wisconsin